Giovanni Battista Dagnino is an Italian economist and academic. He is the Chair of Management and Professor of Digital Strategy at the Libera Università Maria SS. Assunta University of Rome, where he is the Founding Director of the MSc Degree in Economics and Management. He is known for his work on coopetition strategy and for the study of temporary competitive advantage.

Education 

He graduated at Bocconi University of Milan and received his PhD Degree in Business Economics and Management from the University of Catania and MURST-The Italian Ministry for University and Scientific and Technological Research. He has also studied Political Science and International Affairs at the University of Palermo.

He has held visiting positions at Harvard Business School, Tuck School of Business at Dartmouth, Wharton School, London Business School, IESE Business School, Grenoble Ecole de Management, the University of Mannheim and IAE Universidad Austral, Argentina.

Career 
Since 2001, Dagnino has researched coopetition strategy, and, with Richard D'Aveni and Ken Smith, in 2010 has inaugurated the study of temporary competitive advantage as a consequence of hypercompetition. In addition, Dagnino is researching hubris-driven strategies and the relationships between strategy, entrepreneurship and governance. In this field, he received the "Best Paper Proceedings" Award by the Academy of Management for a study on corporate governance and international diversification.

Dagnino's research revolves around the advancement of the strategic theory of the firm with specific focus on coopetition strategy dynamics, the relationships between strategy, entrepreneurship and governance, and the management of temporary advantages.

More recently, he has been carrying out various research projects and graduate teaching on digital transformation strategies, digital mindset, big data and advanced analytics. 
 
Dagnino's work has appeared in books such as "Coopetition Strategy: Theory Experiments and Cases", Routledge, 2009; "New Frontiers in Entrepreneurship. Recognizing, Seizing, and Executing Opportunities", Springer, 2010; "Coopetition: Winning Strategies for the 21st Century", Elgar, 2010; "Research Methods for Strategic Management", Routledge, 2016; "Entrepreneurial Ecosystems and the Diffusion of Startups", Elgar, 2018, and "Foundations of Coopetition Strategy. A Framework for Competition and Cooperation", Routledge-Giappichelli, 2021.

He was Associate Editor of Long Range Planning and served on the editorial boards of Academy of Management Review, Strategic Management Journal, Long Range Planning, Journal of Management and Governance, International Journal of Strategic Business Alliances, International Studies of Management and Organization, American Journal of Business, Journal of Entrepreneurship, Business and Economics and Journal of Industrial and Business Economics, as well as in the scientific advisory board of Grenoble Ecole de Management.

Dagnino is Co-editor of the Journal of Management and Governance, chair of the Scientific Committee of LUMSA Digital Hub, as well as chair of the Departmental Committee on Sustainability

Selected work
Dagnino, G. B. (2009). "Coopetition strategy: a new kind of interfirm dynamics for value creation". In Coopetition strategy (pp. 45–63). Routledge.
Padula, G., & Dagnino, G. B. (2007). "Untangling the rise of coopetition: the intrusion of competition in a cooperative game structure". International Studies of Management & Organization, 37(2), 32-52.
Yami, S., Castaldo, S., Dagnino, B., & Le Roy, F. (Eds.). (2010). Coopetition: winning strategies for the 21st century. Edward Elgar Publishing.
Dagnino, G. B., & Rocco, E. (Eds.). (2009). Coopetition strategy: theory, experiments and cases. Routledge.
D'Aveni, R. A., Dagnino, G. B., & Smith, K. G. (2010). "The age of temporary advantage". Strategic management journal, 31(13), 1371-1385.
Cennamo, C.; Dagnino, G. B.; Di Minin, A.; Lanzolla, G. (2020). "Managing Digital Transformation: Scope of Transformation and Modalities of Value Co-Generation and Delivery". California Management Review. 62 (4): 5–16.
Picone, P. M.; Dagnino, G. B.; Minà, A. (2014). "The origin of failure: A multidisciplinary appraisal of the hubris hypothesis and proposed research agenda". Academy of Management Perspectives. 28 (4): 447–468.

References

External links 
 
 

Italian economists
Living people
Year of birth missing (living people)